Purpurocardia purpurata is a marine bivalve mollusc in the family Carditidae. Its genus was long included in Venericardia, but is increasingly treated as distinct.

References
 Powell A. W. B., New Zealand Mollusca, William Collins Publishers Ltd, Auckland, New Zealand 1979 

Carditidae
Bivalves of New Zealand